Abolnasr Sam Mirza Safavi (16 October 1517 – 1566) was a Safavid prince, a son of king (shah) Ismail I (r. 1501–1514). He was an art lover and was the author of the book Tazkare ye Sami or Tohfe ye Sami about poetry and poets.

Career 

Tahmasp I, Sam Mirza's elder brother, appointed him as a teenager, to be the governor of Herat in his third campaign to Khorasan and appointed Aghzivar Khan as Sam Mirza's custodian.

Sam Mirza balked at his brother's action upon his retainers' instigation, but he regretted later and asked his brother for forgiveness. Tahmasp I forgave him and took him from Khorasan to Qazvin. In Qazvin, Sam Mirza was a companion of Tahmasp I. In 1549, Sam Mirza asked his brother to allow him to remain in a place for praying. Tahmasp I appointed him as custodian of the mausoleum of Safi-ad-din Ardabili and the governor of Ardabil. At the time he was a governor and custodian and his house was the meeting place of scientists, poets and artists.

In 1561, Sam Mirza asked Tahmasp I to send him to Khorasan. The Shah agreed, but he changed his mind later and sent his and his two children to the Qahqaheh castle near Ardebil. Finally in 1566, Tahmasp I ordered the death of Sam Mirza and his children and also Alqas Mirza's children.

Personal life 
Sam Mirza was born by one of Ismail I's Georgian wives. In 1578, 'Isa Khan Gorji (Jesse) married a daughter of Sam Mirza, by his wife, a daughter of Husain Khan-e Shamlu.

References

Sources

Further reading 
 

16th-century Iranian poets
Safavid princes
Safavid governors of Herat
16th-century Iranian writers
Iranian people of Georgian descent
16th-century people of Safavid Iran
1517 births
1566 deaths